The Teita mabuya (Trachylepis keroanensis) is a species of skink found in Guinea.

References

Trachylepis
Reptiles described in 1921
Taxa named by Paul Chabanaud